Alexon dos Santos Maximiano (born 12 October 1982) is a Brazilian former athlete who competed as a javelin thrower.

Born in Manacapuru, Amazonas, Maximiano was based out of Manaus. He was the South American U23 champion in 2004 and qualified for his first Pan American Games in 2007, with a personal best throw of 78.57 m at a meet in Fortaleza. At the Pan American Games, which were held in Rio de Janeiro, he finished with a surprise bronze medal, throwing a best of 75.04 m. He also represented Brazil at the 2007 World Championships in Osaka.

References

External links

1982 births
Living people
Brazilian male javelin throwers
World Athletics Championships athletes for Brazil
Athletes (track and field) at the 2007 Pan American Games
Pan American Games bronze medalists for Brazil
Pan American Games medalists in athletics (track and field)
Medalists at the 2007 Pan American Games
Sportspeople from Amazonas (Brazilian state)
20th-century Brazilian people
21st-century Brazilian people